Jamesia phileta is a species of beetle in the family Cerambycidae. It was described by Dillon and Dillon in 1945. It is known from Peru.

References

Onciderini
Beetles described in 1945